Kaipattoor Bridge is a concrete bridge in Pathanamthitta, Kerala that connects Kaipattoor and Omalloor over the Achankovil River.

References

Bridges in Kerala